Yunus railway station  is a railway station in Kartal, Istanbul on the Marmaray commuter rail line. It is located on Tercüme Avenue, one block north of Çetin Emeç Boulevard on the coast and is the easternmost station in Kartal.

The original station was opened on 22 September 1872 by the Ottoman government, as part of the railway from Kadıköy to İzmit. In 1949, the station was rebuilt and expanded to two side platforms, serving two tracks. Commuter rail service from Haydarpaşa to Gebze began in 1951 and the station was electrified in 1969. The station closed down in 2013 for the construction of the new Marmaray rail project and was demolished shortly after. In 2016, the current station was built as an island platform serving two tracks, with a third express track on the south side. Yunus station was reopened by March 12, 2019.

References

Railway stations in Istanbul Province
Railway stations opened in 1872
1872 establishments in the Ottoman Empire
Kartal